Billy McConnachie (born 16 July 1990) is a Scotland international rugby league footballer who played as a  or  for the Ipswich Jets in the Queensland Cup.

Background
McConnachie was born in Mount Isa, Queensland, Australia.

Career
McConnachie has represented Scotland at the 2016 Rugby League Four Nations. He made his representative début for Scotland against Australia in the opening match of the Four Nations.

References

External links
QRL profile

1990 births
Australian people of Scottish descent
Australian rugby league players
Indigenous Australian rugby league players
Ipswich Jets players
Living people
Rugby league props
Rugby league second-rows
Scotland national rugby league team players
Rugby league players from Mount Isa